Seleki is a village in Basse Casamance in the south of Senegal. The presence of cases à impluvium, typical of Jola architecture, greatly contribute to the reputation of the village.

History
Seleki is also the name of an ancient kingdom as well as of an ethnic group in a region that was very resistant to French colonialism. Several French soldiers were killed at the Battle of Seleki on December 1, 1886, including Lieutenant Truche.

On May 17, 1906, when Djignabo Badji, a charismatic leader and fetish leader of the Seleki who was believed to be indestructible, led an attack against French troops led by Lieutenant Lauque, Badji was killed and subsequently entered into local legend.

The boukout, an initiation ceremony, took place in Seleki in 1972.

Administration
Seleki is part of the rural community of Enampore, Nyassia, Ziguinchor.

Geography
Seleki is located within walking distance of the left bank of the estuary of the Casamance River. The closest villages are Etama, Enampore, Essyl, and Batinière.

Flora
The village is surrounded by lush vegetation, including many Palmyra Palms and mangos.

Population
Seleki is one of the few villages where people still speak Bandial.

Economy
Seleki's economy relies mainly on rice and a little discovery tourism.

An application for registration of all the Bandial cases à impluvium on the World Heritage List was filed with UNESCO on November 18, 2005.

Gallery

See also

References

External links

Maps, weather and airports for Seleki

Populated places in the Ziguinchor Department